General elections were held in Tonga on 3 and 4 February 1993 to elect members of the Legislative Assembly of Tonga.  Nine nobles and nine people's representatives were elected.  Six of the latter favoured democratic reform. Voter turnout was 59.3%.

Results

References

Tonga
1993 in Tonga
Elections in Tonga
February 1993 events in Oceania